Burj Bhalaike, sometimes spelled  Buraj Bhalaike, or Burj Bhalai, is a village  in the Sardulgarh tehsil of Mansa district in Punjab, India.

Geography

Mansa is the nearest railway station, lying  to its north, Sardulgarh (22 km) to the southwest, the city and district of Bathinda to the northwest and the city and district of Sangrur to the northeast.

Education

There is a Govt. Primary School and a Govt. High School in Burj Bhalaike.

References

Villages in Mansa district, India